Cephalotes biguttatus is a species of arboreal ant of the genus Cephalotes, characterized by an odd shaped head and the ability to "parachute" by steering their fall if they drop off of the tree they're on. Giving their name also as gliding ants.

A member of the multispinosus clade differing from its outgroup species by the presence of gastral spots and from the two ingroups by the superficial sculpture of the worker and soldier, and, in the soldier only, by the absence of cephalic disc.

References

biguttatus
Insects described in 1890